At least three ships of the Hellenic Navy have borne the name Adrias :

 , a  launched in 1942 as HMS Border but transferred to Greece and renamed before completion. She was returned to the Royal Navy in 1945.
 , a  launched in 1942 as HMS Tanatside she was transferred to Greece in 1946 and renamed. She was scrapped in 1964.
 , an  launched in 1977 as HNLMS Callenburgh she was transferred to Greece in 1994 and renamed.

Hellenic Navy ship names